Rodney Clement Austen Vandergert (11 May 1935 – 4 May 2009) was a prominent Sri Lankan diplomat and civil servant, who served as the Permanent Secretary to the Ministry of Foreign Affairs of Sri Lanka and Chairman of the Public Service Commission. He had served as Sri Lankan High Commissioner to Canada and Ambassador to People’s Republic of China & Soviet Union.

Education
Vandergert was educated at the Royal College Colombo where he won the Governor-General's prize. He then pursued higher studies at the University of Ceylon graduating with LLB and qualified as an Advocate of the Supreme Court at the Colombo Law College. Later would gain a master's degree in Law from the New York University, specializing in International Public Law.

Diplomatic career
In 1960 he was selected to the Ceylon Overseas Service. After joining the Foreign Service he served in several foreign countries that included United States, Pakistan. Within the foreign ministry he served in several capacities including that of Legal Advisor to the Ministry of Foreign Affairs, Director United Nations & Multi Lateral Affairs Division and Director-General Political Affairs. He served as Sri Lanka's High Commissioner in Canada, Ambassador in Moscow (Soviet Union) with concurrent accreditation in Prague, Warsaw, East Berlin and Ambassador in Beijing (People's Republic of China). Thereafter he was appointed to the post of Permanent Secretary of the Ministry of Foreign Affairs (known as Foreign Secretary) as the country's most senior diplomat in 1994. At the time he was the second career diplomat to be appointed to this post till then.

After retiring from the foreign service, he served as Chairman of the Public Service Commission from 2002 to 2005 and was a visiting lecturer in International Law at the Law Faculty. He was honorary member of the Dutch Burgher Union of Ceylon. He died in May 2009.

References and external links
Mr. Rodney Vandergert
Rodney Clement Austen Vandergert
Appreciation Rodney Vandergert - a gentleman who was held in high regard

2009 deaths
Academic staff of the University of Colombo
Alumni of Ceylon Law College
Alumni of Royal College, Colombo
Alumni of the University of Ceylon
Ambassadors of Sri Lanka to China
Ambassadors of Sri Lanka to the Soviet Union
Burgher academics
Burgher civil servants
Burgher lawyers
High Commissioners of Sri Lanka to Canada
New York University School of Law alumni
Permanent secretaries of Sri Lanka
Sri Lankan Christians
1935 births
Sri Lanka Sikhamani